The Imitation of Christ is the Christian ideal of following the example of Jesus.

Imitation of Christ may also refer to:

In religion:
The Imitation of Christ, a 15th-century spiritual book by Thomas à Kempis

In art and music:

Imitation of Christ (film), a 1967 film by Andy Warhol titled after the book by Kempis
Imitation of Christ (designs), an art project and fashion line created by Tara Subkoff and Matthew Damhave
"Imitation of Christ", a song on The Psychedelic Furs (album)

See also
Imitatio dei
Imitation of Life (disambiguation)